Debbie Ryan (born November 4, 1952) is a former women's basketball coach who coached at the University of Virginia. Ryan also coached the American women's basketball team at the 2003 Pan American Games. She was diagnosed with pancreatic cancer in 2000 but is currently in remission. She was inducted into the Women's Basketball Hall of Fame in 2008. Ryan was also inducted into the Virginia Sports Hall of Fame in 2012.

The US Basketball Writers Association (USBWA) awarded her the Coach of the Year award in 1991. She was also named the Naismith College Coach of the Year.

Ryan started as an assistant coach at Virginia under head coach Dan Bonner. In 1977, Ryan, who had recently completed graduate school in Virginia, was asked to become the head coach of the women's basketball program. She accepted, to become only the third head coach in the program's history.  Ryan resigned after 34 years of head coaching duties at UVA at the completion the women's 2010–2011 basketball season. After her resignation, Ryan was a volunteer assistant coach of Seattle Storm for the 2011 WNBA season, reuniting with her former player Jenny Boucek, who is an assistant coach there. In 2014 Ryan was honored as one of the Library of Virginia's "Virginia Women in History" for her contributions to women's basketball and her actions as a cancer treatment advocate.

US basketball
Ryan served as the head coach of the US representative to the 1999 World University Games (also known as the Universiade).  The event was held in Palma de Mallorca, Spain.  The US team opened with a 134–37 win over South Africa.  The second game was against Canada, which the US team lost in a close match 68–67.  The US could not afford to lose another game if they wished to win a medal, and won the next game against Japan 106–66.  They next faced undefeated Russia, and fell behind by twelve points at halftime, but came back and won 79–68.  The US fell behind in their next game against undefeated China, but rallied and went on to win 89–78.  They beat Brazil to advance to the semi-final, where they faced Lithuania.  The game was not close, with the US winning 70–49.  That set up a rematch with China, on their home court with 18,000 spectators.  The USA only had a four-point lead at halftime, but did better in the second half, and won 87–69 to claim the gold medal.

Head coaching record

See also
List of college women's basketball coaches with 600 wins
 Virginia Cavaliers basketball

References

External links
 Bio from the 2003 Pan American Games
 Bio from Virginia
 Debbie Ryan | Expert Healthcare Articles

1952 births
Living people
American women's basketball coaches
Basketball coaches from New Jersey
College women's basketball players in the United States
People from Hopewell Township, Mercer County, New Jersey
Sportspeople from Mercer County, New Jersey
University of Virginia alumni
Ursinus College alumni
Virginia Cavaliers women's basketball coaches